The Mohawk River in New York is a tributary of the Hudson River.

Mohawk River may refer one of several rivers in the United States:

Mohawk River (New Hampshire), a tributary of the Connecticut River
Mohawk River (Oregon), a tributary of the McKenzie River

See also 
 East Branch Mohawk River (New Hampshire)
 West Branch Mohawk River (New Hampshire)
 Mohawk (disambiguation)